The discography of American country music artist Rissi Palmer contains three studio albums, three extended plays, nine singles and seven music videos. After appearing on a program by Country Music Television, Palmer signed a record contract with 1720 Entertainment. In 2007, the label issued Palmer's first single titled "Country Girl". The track peaked in the top 50 on the Billboard Hot Country Songs chart that year. Her eponymous debut album was released in October 2007 and made various chart positions. The album spawned her second charting single titled "Hold on to Me". 

In 2008, Palmer released a cover of Jordin Sparks' pop hit "No Air", which reached number 47 on the country singles chart. Palmer did not release a new record until 2013's Best Day Ever. The album was made following the birth of her daughter. In 2015, she issued an extended play titled The Back Porch Sessions. This was followed by her next studio album in 2019 titled Revival.

Albums

Studio albums

Extended plays

Singles

As lead artist

As a featured artist

Music videos

References

External links
 Rissi Palmer music at her official website

Discographies of American artists
Country music discographies